Ian Peter-Budge (born 26 June 1968) is a former professional tennis player from Australia.

Biography
Peter-Budge, a player from Melbourne, was coached by Warren Maher.

During his career he made two main draw appearances at the Australian Open, both as a wildcard. At the 1989 Australian Open he lost to Anders Järryd in the first round and at the 1990 Australian Open he was beaten again in the opening round, by Nduka Odizor.

He now works as a tennis coach in Melbourne's eastern suburbs.

References

External links
 
 

1968 births
Living people
Australian male tennis players
Tennis players from Melbourne
20th-century Australian people